Xbox Live Arcade Unplugged is a series of Xbox 360 games released which allow the play of Xbox Live Arcade games without requiring a purchase via Xbox Live.

Xbox Live Arcade Unplugged Vol. 1

Xbox Live Arcade Unplugged Vol. 1 is a retail package of six Xbox Live Arcade games and three demos.

The disc works by inserting it into the system just like any other game. However, rather than directly launching any of the titles, it brings you to the game menu in the Xbox 360 games menu where you see extra games that are playable.

Games included

Xbox Live Arcade Compilation Disc

Xbox Live Arcade Compilation Disc is a package of five Xbox Live Arcade games. The compilation was packaged with the Xbox 360 Arcade.

The disc works by inserting it into the system just like any other game. However, rather than directly launching any of the titles, it adds five items to the Xbox Live Arcade menu with a small disc icon next to each name. A double pack featuring this game and Sega Superstars Tennis was also packaged with some Xbox 360 units.

Games included

Xbox Live Arcade Game Pack

Xbox Live Arcade Game Pack is a package of three Xbox Live Arcade games. The compilation was packaged with a black wireless controller.

The disc works by inserting it into the system just like any other game. However, rather than directly launching any of the titles, it adds three items to the Xbox Live Arcade menu with a small disc icon next to each name.

Games included

Xbox 360 Triple Pack

Xbox 360 Triple Pack is a package of three popular Xbox Live Arcade games.

A game selection menu launches by inserting the disc into the system. All three games are also added to the game library when the disc is in the tray. The disc is needed to play the games even when the games are installed. Games cannot be installed separately.

Games included

Future volumes
Microsoft's Worldwide Games Portfolio Manager David Edery has stated in an interview in 2007 that Unplugged Vol. 2 was one of many "options" being "evaluated" for release.

Companies such as Capcom (Capcom Digital Collection), Konami (Konami Classics), Namco Bandai Games (Namco Museum Virtual Arcade), PopCap Games (PopCap Arcade), Sega (Dreamcast Collection), and Ubisoft (Triple Pack: Outland / From Dust / Beyond Good & Evil HD) have made disc compilations of their respective XBLA games.

Atari SA also published their own Xbox Live Arcade game compilation. Titled Qubed, it compiled three Xbox Live Arcade games from Q Entertainment onto a single disc: Every Extend Extra Extreme, Lumines Live!, and Rez HD (although the latter two were originally published by Microsoft Game Studios, and Rez was originally developed by United Game Artists).

References

External links
 Xbox Live Arcade Unplugged Vol. 1 on Xbox.com

2006 video games
Microsoft game compilations
Bandai Namco video game compilations
Konami video game compilations
Xbox 360-only games
Xbox 360 Live Arcade games
Xbox 360 games
Xbox 360 Live Arcade compilations
Pack-in video games